Calima may refer to:

Colombia 
 Calima culture, pre-Columbian culture from Colombia
 Calima, Valle del Cauca, municipality of Valle del Cauca, Colombia
 Calima River, river in Colombia

Other 
 Calima (arachnid), a genus in family Hubbardiidae
 Calima Aviación, a Spanish airline
 Calima, a dust wind originating in the Saharan Air Layer
 CALIMA or The Temple of Semos, a place in Planet of the Apes (2001 film)

See also 
 Kalima (disambiguation)